Park Ki-hyuk (Hangul: 박기혁, Hanja: 朴基赫; born June 4, 1981 in Daegu, South Korea) is a retired South Korean shortstop. He was considered one of the top defensive shortstops (along with Park Jin-man) in the KBO League.

Amateur career

Park attended Daegu Commerce High School in Daegu, South Korea. In 1999, he was named in South Korea national junior team's roster for the 1999 World Junior Baseball Championship. There Park led the attack alongside Choo Shin-soo and Jeong Keun-woo.

Notable international careers

Professional career

Park made his pro debut in 2000, drafted by the Lotte Giants in the 2nd round (2nd pick) of the 2000 KBO draft. He had several mediocre seasons, but earned a starting position in the Giants' infield in the 2003 season, playing in 95 games.

Park participated in the 2006 KBO All-Star Game and 2006 Asian Games.

Though predominantly known as a light-hitting defensive infielder, Park had his most offensively productive season in 2008, when he hit .291 and posted career-highs in RBI (36), runs (47) and hits (102). After the end of the 2008 season, he won his first Golden Glove Award at shortstop.

In addition to achieving a level of personal success, Park was called up to the South Korea national baseball team for the 2009 World Baseball Classic. He was expected to serve as backup to another defensive wizard, Park Jin-man, for Team Korea. Park Jin-man, however, did not make the team because of an inflamed shoulder, and Park Ki-hyuk took over as the starting shortstop. Appearing in all nine games for South Korea, Park Ki-hyuk struggled at the plate, going just 3-for-26 with 3 walks, but he filled Park Jin-man's void at shortstop perfectly, making numerous acrobatic defensive plays in the field.

Awards and honors
2008 Golden Glove Award (SS)

Notable international careers

External links 
Career statistics and player information from Korea Baseball Organization

2009 World Baseball Classic players
Lotte Giants players
KT Wiz players
KBO League shortstops
South Korean baseball players
1981 births
Living people
Sportspeople from Daegu
Asian Games medalists in baseball
Baseball players at the 2006 Asian Games
Asian Games bronze medalists for South Korea
Medalists at the 2006 Asian Games
South Korean Buddhists